The Spikers’ Turf Collegiate Conference was the 2nd conference of the Spikers' Turf men's volleyball which started on July 13, 2015  and ended on September 27, 2015 at the Filoil Flying V Arena in San Juan. There were twelve (12) competing teams in this conference.

Tournament Format

Preliminaries (PL)
 Twelve (12) participating teams will be divided into two (2) PL groups - Group A & Group B.
 Each pool will play a single round robin.
 The TOP 4 TEAMS PER POOL (or a total of eight (8) teams) will advance to the Quarterfinal Round.
 The bottom two (2) per group will be eliminated from the tournament.

Quarterfinals (QF)
 The eight (8) quarter finalists will be regrouped into one pool.
 The top four (4) teams after a single round robin will advance to the semi-finals round.

Semi-finals (SF)
 The four (4) semi-finalists will compete against each other in a best-of-three series as follows: Rank 1 vs Rank 4 and Rank 2 vs Rank 3.
 Top two (2) SF teams will compete for GOLD.
 Bottom two (2) SF teams will compete for BRONZE.

Finals
The battle for GOLD and the battle for BRONZE will both follow the best-of-three format, provided:
 If the battle for GOLD ends in two (2) matches (2-0), then there will no longer be a Game 3 for either GOLD or Bronze. A tie in BRONZE (1-1) will be resolve using FIVB rules.
 A tie in the series for GOLD (1-1) after Game 2 will be broken in a Game 3, regardless of the result of the series in BRONZE.

Participating Teams

Conference Line-up

Group A

Group B

Preliminaries

Group A

|}

Match Result

|}

Group B

|}

Match Result

|}

Quarterfinals

|}

Match Result

|}
Play-offs match for the 4th spot in the semis

|}
National College of Business and Arts advances to the semi-finals round.

Semi-finals
 Ranking is based from the quarter final round.
 All series are best-of-3

Rank 1 vs Rank 4

|}
 Ateneo de Manila University advances to the final round.

Rank 2 vs Rank 3

|}
 National University advances to the final round.
 Emilio Aguinaldo College & National College of Business & Arts will battle for the 3rd place (BRONZE).

Finals

Battle for Bronze

Emilio Aguinaldo College wins the series in two games

Battle for Gold

Ateneo de Manila University wins the series in two games

Awards

Most Valuable Player (Finals)
  Marck Jesus Espejo
Most Valuable Player (Conference)
  Marck Jesus Espejo
Best Setter
  April Jhon Pagtalunan
Best  Outside Spikers
  Howard Mojica
  Marck Jesus Espejo

Best Middle Blockers
  Kim Malabunga
  Reyson Fuentes
Best Opposite Spiker
  Ysay Marasigan
Best Libero
  Ricky Marcos

Final standings

 Note: 
 (G) - Guest Player
 ((c)) - Team Captain
 (L) - Libero

 Ateneo de Manila University Blue Eagles made history in the Spikers' Turf by being the first team to sweep a conference (13 wins & 0 loss).

Venue
Filoil Flying V Arena, San Juan

External links
 www.spikersturf.com/ - Official website

See also
 Shakey's V-League 12th Season Collegiate Conference

References

Spikers' Turf
2015 in Philippine sport